Baldo degli Ubaldi is a station on Line A of the Rome Metro, situated on Via Baldo degli Ubaldi, near the crossroads with Via Bonaventura Cerretti. The station was inaugurated, along with the others between Valle Aurelia and Battistini, on 1 January 2000.

Services
This station has:
 Access for the disabled.
 Escalators

Located nearby
Istituto Dermatologico dell'Immacolata

References

External links
Baldo degli Ubaldi station on the Rome public transport site (in Italian)

Rome Metro Line A stations
Railway stations opened in 2000
2000 establishments in Italy
Rome Q. XIII Aurelio
Railway stations in Italy opened in the 21st century